John Marshall (October 2, 1945 – November 2, 2021) was an American football coach. His final NFL stop was defensive coordinator for the Oakland Raiders from 2009–2010.

Marshall, a coaching veteran of over 40 years, was mostly associated with coaching linebackers.  He earned two Super Bowl rings during his time with the San Francisco 49ers, where he was an assistant.

Marshall coached linebackers for the Detroit Lions in 2002, where he was on the staff of Marty Mornhinweg.  Marshall had previously served as defensive coordinator under Steve Mariucci with the San Francisco 49ers in 1997 and 1998. Marshall died in 2021 at the age of 76; he had prostate cancer in his later years.

References

1945 births
2021 deaths
Atlanta Falcons coaches
Carolina Panthers coaches
Detroit Lions coaches
Green Bay Packers coaches
Indianapolis Colts coaches
National Football League defensive coordinators
Oakland Raiders coaches
Oregon Ducks football coaches
San Francisco 49ers coaches
Seattle Seahawks coaches
USC Trojans football coaches
Virginia Destroyers coaches
Washington State Cougars football players
Junior college football coaches in the United States